For the first time since 1992, a national final was held in Germany to select their entry for the Eurovision Song Contest. At the contest, represented by Leon with "Planet of Blue", Germany failed to progress from the pre-qualification round, leading to the first, and so far only time that Germany failed to participate at Eurovision.

Before Eurovision

Ein bisschen Glück 
The German national final for the 1996 Eurovision, organised by ARD, was held on 1 March at the Friedrich-Ebert-Halle in Hamburg, presented by Jens Riewa. 10 songs competed, and a public televote was held to select the winner: this was Leon with "Planet of Blue", which received 37.9% of the vote. Only the top three songs were announced during the show, however the placings of all the songs are known.

At Eurovision
The 1996 Contest implemented an audio-only qualifying round for all competing country (except for host country Norway). 22 songs from the 29 competing could join Norway in the live final on 16 May. However Germany was not among those to qualify, placing 24th in the line-up.

This caused some aggregation in ARD and the EBU, the contest's organisers, because, due to its population size Germany was one of the biggest financial contributors to the contest. This qualification failure, among other things, led to the formation of the "Big Five" status.

Voting

References

External links
 German National Final 1996

1996
Countries in the Eurovision Song Contest 1996
Eurovision
Eurovision